Ali Pilli (born 1955) is a Turkish Cypriot doctor and politician. He is the minister of Health of the 41st government of Northern Cyprus. He is from Paphos.

Early life and career 
Ali Pilli was born on 1955 in the village Falya of Paphos. He completed his primary education in Falya and secondary education and high school in Paphos. After graduating from Çukurova University Medical School he received the title of medical doctor. After the 2013 general elections Pilli was appointed as the Minister of Health.

References 

People from Paphos
1955 births
Living people
Government ministers of Northern Cyprus
Çukurova University alumni